The Passionate Quest is a 1924 novel by the British writer E. Phillips Oppenheim.

Adaption
In 1926 it was adapted into an American silent film of the same title directed by J. Stuart Blackton and starring May McAvoy, Willard Louis, Louise Fazenda.

References

Bibliography
 Goble, Alan. The Complete Index to Literary Sources in Film. Walter de Gruyter, 199

1924 British novels
Novels by E. Phillips Oppenheim
British novels adapted into films
Hodder & Stoughton books